Golabar, also rendered as Ghalabar or Qolabar or Qulabir, may refer to:
 Golabar-e Sofla
 Golabar Rural District